York University, also known as YorkU or simply YU,  is a public research university in Toronto, Ontario, Canada. It is Canada's third-largest university, and it has approximately 55,700 students, 7,000 faculty and staff, and over 325,000 alumni worldwide. It has 11 faculties, including the Faculty of Liberal Arts and Professional Studies, Faculty of Science, Lassonde School of Engineering, Schulich School of Business, Osgoode Hall Law School, Glendon College, Faculty of Education, Faculty of Health, Faculty of Environmental and Urban Change, Faculty of Graduate Studies, School of the Arts, Media, Performance and Design, and 28 research centres.

York University was established in 1959 as a non-denominational institution by the York University Act, which received royal assent in the Legislative Assembly of Ontario on 26 March of that year. Its first class was held in September 1960 in Falconer Hall on the University of Toronto campus with a total of 76 students. In the fall of 1961, York moved to its first campus, Glendon College, which was leased from U of T, and began to emphasize liberal arts and part-time adult education. In 1965, the university opened a second campus, the Keele Campus, in North York, within the neighbourhood community now called York University Heights.

Several of York's programs have gained notable recognition both nationally and internationally. York houses Canada's oldest film school, which has been ranked one of the best in Canada, with an acceptance rate comparable to that of USC School of Cinematic Arts and Tisch School of the Arts. York's Osgoode Hall Law School was ranked fourth best in Canada, behind U of T, McGill, and UBC. In The Economists 2011 full-time MBA rankings, York's Schulich School of Business ranked ninth in the world, and first in Canada, and in CNN Expansions ranking of MBA programs, Schulich ranked 18th in the world, placing first in Canada. York's School of Kinesiology and Health Science ranked fourth in Canada and 24th best in the world in 2018.

Over the last twenty years, York has become a centre for labour strife with several faculty and other strikes occurring, including the longest university strike in Canadian history in 2018.

History

York University was established in 1959 as a non-denominational institution by the York University Act, which received Royal Assent in the Legislative Assembly of Ontario on 26 March of that year. Its first class was held in September 1960 in Falconer Hall on the University of Toronto campus with a total of 76 students.

The policy of university education initiated in the 1960s responded to population pressure and the belief that higher education was a key to social justice and economic productivity for individuals and for society. The governance was modelled on the provincial University of Toronto Act of 1906, which established a bicameral system of university government consisting of a senate (faculty), responsible for academic policy, and a board of governors (citizens) exercising exclusive control over financial policy and having formal authority in all other matters. The president, appointed by the board, was to provide a link between the two bodies and to perform institutional leadership.

In the fall of 1961, York moved to its first campus, Glendon College, and began to emphasize liberal arts and part-time adult education. York became independent in 1965, after an initial period of affiliation with the University of Toronto (U of T), under the York University Act, 1965. Its main campus on the northern outskirts of Toronto opened in 1965.

Murray Ross, who continues to be honoured today at the university in several ways – including the Murray G. Ross Award – was still vice-president of U of T when he was approached to become York University's new president. At the time, York University was envisaged as a feeder campus to U of T, until Ross's powerful vision led it to become a completely separate institution.

In 1965, the university opened a second campus, the Keele Campus, in North York, in the Jane and Finch community. The Glendon campus became a bilingual liberal arts college led by Escott Reid, who envisaged it as a national institution to educate Canada's future leaders, a vision shared by Prime Minister Lester Pearson, who formally opened Glendon College in 1966.

The first Canadian undergraduate program in dance opened at York University in 1970. In 1972, Canada Post featured the nascent institution on 8¢ stamps, entitled York University Campus, North York, Ont. The first Canadian PhD program in women's studies opened with five candidates in January 1992.

Its bilingual mandate and focus on the liberal arts continue to shape Glendon's special status within York University. The new Keele Campus was regarded as somewhat isolated, in a generally industrialized part of the city. Petrol storage facilities are still across the street. Some of the early architecture was unpopular with many, not only for the brutalist designs, but the vast expanses between buildings, which was not viewed as suitable for the climate. In the last two decades, the campus has been intensified with new buildings, including a dedicated student centre and new fine arts, computer science and business administration buildings, a small shopping mall, and a hockey arena. The Aviva Centre tennis stadium, built in 2004, is a perennial host of the Canada Masters tennis tournament. As Toronto has spread further out, York has found itself in a relatively central location within the built-up Greater Toronto Area (GTA), and in particular, near the Jane and Finch neighbourhood. Its master plan envisages a denser on-campus environment commensurate with that location. Students occupied the university's administration offices in March 1997, protesting escalating tuition hikes.

In June 2014, the university announced that a new campus would be constructed in Markham, Ontario.  The campus will be built near Highway 407, between Kennedy Road and Warden Avenue in partnership with Seneca College.  The new campus would house approximately 4,200 students and is anticipated to accommodate up to 10,000 students in future phases. On May 20, 2015, the provincial government announced it will provide financial contribution to this new project.

On October 24, 2018, the provincial government announced it would pull its funding for the campus, along with funding for the planned satellite campuses of Laurier University and Ryerson University. After this cancellation of funding for the Markham project, York University and its partners planned to seek alternative funding. In July 2020, the provincial government allowed plans for the university to go through.

Campuses

Keele Campus

The Keele Campus is the main campus of York University and is located in northern Toronto bordering York Region. Most of the university's faculties reside here, including Liberal Arts, Fine Arts, Business, Law, Environmental Studies, Science and Engineering, Education, and Health. All together, nearly 50,000 students attend classes on the Keele campus.York University station is a Toronto subway station located on Keele campus. Other transit infrastructure located on Keele campus or nearby includes the York University Busway and the York University GO Station.

Glendon Campus

Glendon College is a bilingual liberal arts faculty and separate campus of York University. Glendon College is home to the Leslie Frost library.

Markham Campus

In 2018, York University announced a proposal to construct a third campus in the city of Markham. The Government of Ontario supported to partially fund the construction and was announced by premier Doug Ford on July 23, 2020.

Other locations
While most of the Schulich School of Business and Osgoode Hall Law School programs are offered at the Keele Campus, both of them maintain satellite facilities in downtown Toronto. Schulich operates the Miles S. Nadal Management Centre at 222 Bay Street (Ernst & Young Tower within the Toronto-Dominion Centre), while Osgoode Hall has a Professional Development Centre at One Dundas West Tower within the Toronto Eaton Centre.

Faculty of Environmental and Urban Change The Lillian Meighen Wright Centre is billed as an eco campus next to Las Nubes Forest Reserve in Costa Rica.

Academics

York's approximately 1500 full-time faculty and academic librarians and archivists are represented by the York University Faculty Association. Contract faculty, teaching assistants, and graduate assistants are represented by CUPE Local 3903.

Admissions
York University has over 120 undergraduate programs with 17 degree types (BA, iBA, BHS, BSc, iBSc, BBA, iBBA, BEng, BES, BDes, BPA, BFA, BCom, BEd, BDEM, BHRM, BScN, BSW) and offers over 170 degree options. They admit to 30 international degrees offering international language study and opportunities to study abroad at more than 100 international universities. Its international students represent over 150 countries around the world. York University's Film Department houses Canada's oldest film school.

Reputation

York University has ranked in a number of post-secondary rankings. In the 2022 Academic Ranking of World Universities rankings, the university ranked 401–500 in the world and 18–19 in Canada. The 2023 QS World University Rankings ranked the university 456th in the world, and sixteenth in Canada. The 2023 Times Higher Education World University Rankings ranked York 401–500 in the world, and 17th in Canada. York ranked 14th Globally and fourth in Canada in the Times Higher Education Impact Rankings for Climate Action. In the 2022–23 U.S. News & World Report Best Global University Ranking, the university ranked 426th in the world, and 16th in Canada. The Canadian-based Maclean's magazine ranked York University fifth in their 2023 Canadian comprehensive university category, tied with Carleton University.

The university's research performance has been noted in several bibliometric university rankings, which uses citation analysis to evaluates the impact a university has on academic publications. The 2019 Performance Ranking of Scientific Papers for World Universities ranked the university 488th in the world, and 19th in Canada, whereas the University Ranking by Academic Performance placed the university 488th in the world, and 19th in Canada.

York University has also been featured in rankings that evaluates the employment prospects of its graduates. In QS's 2022 graduate employability ranking, the university ranked 301–500 in the world, and 10–17 in Canada.

Faculties

York University's Film Department houses Canada's oldest film school and has been ranked one of the best in Canada, with an acceptance rate comparable to that of USC School of Cinematic Arts and Tisch School of the Arts.

York University is home to the oldest and largest environmental studies faculty in Canada. From 1999 to 2018, York University offered the first and largest graphic design program in Ontario York/Sheridan Design (YSDN). It was a four-year University degree delivered jointly by the two leading educational institutions of design in Canada (York University and Sheridan College). The joint program has been discontinued and beginning with the class entering in 2019, four-year design students will enrol in a new Bachelor of Design offered by York University, one which is geared for the future of the profession.

The Osgoode Hall Law School moved from a downtown location to the York campus in 1969, following the requirement that every law school affiliate with a university. Osgoode Hall offers a number of joint and combined programs.

Research centres and institutes

 Centre for Atmospheric Chemistry
 Centre for Research on Biomolecular Interactions
 Centre for Research in Earth and Space Science
 Centre for Research in Mass Spectrometry
 Centre for Vision Research (CVR)
 York Institute for Social Research
 York Institute for Health Research
 Robarts Centre for Canadian Studies
 Centre for Feminist Research
 Israel and Golda Koschitzky Centre for Jewish Studies
 York Centre for Asian Research
 York Centre for International and Security Studies
 York Entrepreneurship Development Institute (YEDI)
 Centre for Public Policy and Law
 Centre for Refugee Studies
 Centre for Research on Latin America and the Caribbean
 Institute for Technoscience and Society
 Institute for Research on Learning Technologies
 The Jack and Mae Nathanson Centre on Transnational Human Rights, Crime and Security
 LaMarsh Centre for Child and Youth Research
 The City Institute at York University (CITY)
 Global Labour Research Centre
 The Harriet Tubman Institute for Research on the Global Migrations of African Peoples
 York Centre for Education and Community
 Muscle Health Research Centre
 Sensorium: The Centre for Digital Arts and Technology
 Centre for Research on Language Contact
 York Centre for Field Robotics
 The Mariano A. Elia Chair in Italian Canadian Studies
 Psychology Resource Centre

The Art Gallery of York University houses the permanent art collections. The collection of 1500 objects includes Canadian, American, Inuit, and European mixed media, multimedia, installations, painting, photography, prints, drawings, sculpture, sketchbooks, film and video.

The School of the Arts, Media, Performance and Design (AMPD, formerly the Faculty of Fine Arts), offers programmes such as design, ethnomusicology, cultural studies, visual arts, music, dance, and theatre. York's Jazz Department was once overseen by Oscar Peterson. York also has a joint Bachelor of Design program with Sheridan College. York's Departments of Film, Theatre and Creative Writing (which is not affiliated with the Faculty of Fine Arts) offers programmes in film production/directing, acting, and writing respectively, producing many award-winning graduates.

Seneca@York
The Keele campus is host to a satellite facility of Seneca College, and York University offers a number of joint programs with Seneca College

Libraries

The York University library has a number of branches. The Scott Library has materials in humanities, social sciences, fine arts, and environmental studies. The business library is the Peter F. Bronfman Business Library.

Study abroad programs
The university also offers the opportunity for students to earn credits towards their degree while studying abroad through international internships,  the "Discover India" program operated between York and FLAME University, and student exchange programs. The university has student exchange agreements with over 120 institutions in 40 countries.

Student life

Colleges and residences
York has nine undergraduate residential colleges:

Student unions and organizations
York University is home to over 350 student clubs. A number of larger student organizations are supported by student levy fees.  These include the local chapters of the social justice group OPIRG, and Regenesis, an environmental organization on campus that runs farmers' markets at the Keele and Glendon campuses, a free store, a community bike centre and an borrowing centre.

The Village at York University
The Village at York University off-campus student housing area has become a popular area of accommodation for many upper-year and post-graduate students, and the area has had a large amount of attention particularly for large parties hosted by students, including the annual Battle of the Village kegger held in March. There have also been many reports of the level of noise pollution from late-night parties from students living in the area. Safety has also been a pressing issue.

Campus media
Excalibur has been the university's autonomous student newspaper since 1966. In 2008, the YU Free Press was formed as an alternative campus newspaper. Existere is  magazine published by students of the university's professional writing program. The magazine was first published in 1978.

YorkU Magazine (est. 2003) is the official magazine of York University. It is published 3 times a year in both a print and digital format.

Athletics

The university is represented in U Sports by the York Lions. Beginning in 1968 York's sporting teams were known as the "Yeomen", after the Yeomen Warders, the guardians of the fortress and palace at the Tower of London, otherwise known as Beefeaters. Later, the name "Yeowomen" was introduced to encourage women to participate in sports. Popular sentiment ran against this name scheme, however, as many students were fond of noting that a "Yeowoman" was fictitious, neither a real word nor having any historical merit. In 2003, after conducting an extensive internal study, the university replaced both names with the "Lions", as part of a larger renaming effort, and a new logo, now a white and red lion, was brought into line with the university's new visual scheme. The name change also brought York University in line with the 92% of other Canadian universities which use a single name for both sexes' sports teams. Ironically, students often refer to the female Lions teams as the "York Lionesses", even though the name "Lion" is intended to apply to both sexes.

York offers 29 interuniversity sport teams, 12 sport clubs, 35 intramural sport leagues, special events and 10 pick-up sport activities offered daily.

York University has several athletic facilities, some of which are used for major tournaments. These include a football stadium, 4 gymnasia, 5 sport playing fields, 4 softball fields, 9 outdoor tennis courts, 5 squash courts, 3 dance/aerobic studios, 6 ice arenas, a swimming pool, an expanding fitness centre and the new Aviva Centre (home of the Rogers Tennis Cup).

In 2014 the York Lions won four banners: the Canadian Interuniversity Sport (CIS) men's national track and field championship, the Ontario University Athletics women's provincial tennis championship and both the OUA and CIS men's soccer titles. York will be hosting the 2015 CIS Men's Soccer Championships at York Stadium November, 2015. In 2015 and 2016 York Lions Women's Tennis team won the Canadian University National Championships. The volleyball team has been coached by, among others, Olympian Sam Schachter.

Fight song
Notable among a number of songs commonly played and sung at various events such as commencement and convocation, and athletic games are: "York Song", sung to the tune "Harvard".

Fraternities and sororities
Fraternities and sororities are not recognized by York University.

Phi Delta Phi (ΦΔΦ) international legal fraternity, at Osgoode Law School, was given special dispensation when the law school became part of the university, as the fraternity's history with the law school dated back to 1896, and is recognized at York.

Notable people

York has over 200,000 living alumni. Although a large number of alumni live in Ontario, a significant number live in British Columbia, Nova Scotia, Alberta, New York, and Washington, D.C.  York also has over 25,000 alumni overseas.

Distinguished research professors and university professors 
The ranks of "distinguished research professor" and "university professor" are the highest rank a professor can achieve at York University. There are only ever up to a maximum of 25 each of active distinguished research professors and active university professors at any time. It is awarded to members of the faculty who have made outstanding contributions to the university through their work in research.

 Pat Armstrong, 2010: Sociology, Liberal Arts & Professional Studies
 Isabella C. Bakker, 2014: Political Science, Liberal Arts & Professional Studies
 Norbert Bartel, 2006: Physics & Astronomy, Science
 Dawn Bazely, 2017:  Biology, Science
 Ellen Bialystok, 2003: Psychology, Liberal Arts & Professional Studies
 Deborah Britzman, 2006: Education
 James Carley, 2000: English, Liberal Arts & Professional Studies
 Jean-Gabriel Castel, 1986: Osgoode Hall Law School
 Jerome Ch'en, 1984: History, Liberal Arts & Professional Studies
 Lorraine Code, 1998: Philosophy, Liberal Arts & Professional Studies
 J. Douglas Crawford, 2013: Psychology, Health
 Kenneth Davey, 1984: Biology, Science
 Sheila Embleton, 2009: Languages, Literatures & Linguistics, Liberal Arts & Professional Studies
 Stephen Gill, 2006: Political Science, Liberal Arts & Professional Studies
 Jack Granatstein, 1994: History, Liberal Arts & Professional Studies
 Leslie S. Greenberg, 2010: Psychology, Health
 Philip Gulliver, 1985: Anthropology, Liberal Arts & Professional Studies
 Henry S. Harris, 1984: Philosophy, Glendon
 Robert Haynes, 1986: Biology, Science
 Michael Herren, 1999: Humanities, Liberal Arts & Professional Studies
 Eric Hessels, 2006: Physics & Astronomy, Science 
 Richard Hornsey, 2015: Electrical Engineering, Lassonde School of Engineering
 Ian Howard, 1988: Psychology, Liberal Arts & Professional Studies
 Allan Hutchinson, 2006: Osgoode Hall Law School
 Christopher Innes, 1997: English, Liberal Arts & Professional Studies
 Ian Jarvie, 1993: Philosophy, Liberal Arts & Professional Studies
 Michael Kater, 1992: History, Liberal Arts & Professional Studies
 Gabriel Kolko, 1986: History, Liberal Arts & Professional Studies
 A. B. P. Lever, 1998: Chemistry, Science
 Clifford Leznoff, 2003: Chemistry, Science
 Paul Lovejoy, 1997: History, Liberal Arts & Professional Studies
 John C. McConnell, 2005: Earth & Space Science & Engineering, Science & Engineering
 Gareth Morgan, 1992: Commerce, Liberal Arts & Professional Studies
 H. V. Nelles, 2001: History, Liberal Arts & Professional Studies
 Hiroshi Ono, 2001: Psychology, Arts
 Leo Panitch, 1999: Political Science, Liberal Arts & Professional Studies
 Debra Pepler, 2008: Psychology, Health
 Huw Pritchard, 1983: Chemistry, Science
 David M. Regan, 1992: Psychology, Liberal Arts & Professional Studies
 Marcia H. Rioux, 2013: Health Policy & Management, Health
 Beryl Rowland, 1983: English, Liberal Arts & Professional Studies
 Stuart Shanker, 2005: Psychology, Liberal Arts & Professional Studies
 Gordon Shepherd, 1993: Earth & Space Science, Science
 K.W. Michael Siu, 2008: Chemistry, Science
 Brian Slattery, 2008: Osgoode Hall Law School
 Martin Steinbach, 2000: Psychology, Liberal Arts & Professional Studies
 Bridget Stutchbury, 2009: Biology, Science 
 James Tenney, 1995: Music, Fine Arts
 John Tsotsos, 2008: Computer Science & Engineering, Science & Engineering
Leah Vosko, 2003: Political Science, Liberal Arts & Professional Studies
 Jianhong Wu, 2011: Mathematics & Statistics, Science

Chancellors
Wilfred Curtis, former Chief of the Air Staff of the Royal Canadian Air Force,  (December 1959 - June 1968)
Floyd Chalmers, publishing executive and philanthropist, (July 1968 - September 1973)
Walter L. Gordon, former federal finance minister, (October 1973 - November 1977)
John P. Robarts, former premier of Ontario, (December 1977 - May 1982)
John S. Proctor, former bank executive, (May 1982 - September 1983)
J. Tuzo Wilson, geophysicist, (September 1983 - June 1986)
Larry Clarke, founder of SPAR Aerospace, (July 1986 - June 1991)
Oscar Peterson, jazz pianist, (September 1991 - February 1994)
Arden Haynes, former CEO of Imperial Oil, (February 1994 - April 1998)
Avie Bennett, philanthropist, (May 1998 - June 2004)
Peter deCarteret Cory, former justice of the Supreme Court of Canada, (June 2004 - May 2008)
Roy McMurtry, former Chief Justice of Ontario, (May 2008 - June 2014)
Gregory Sorbara, former Ontario cabinet minister, (June 2014 – present)

Presidents

 Murray G. Ross, academic 1959–1970
 David Slater, economist and civil servant 1970–1973
 H. Ian Macdonald, economist and civil servant 1973–1984
 Harry W. Arthurs, lawyer and academic 1985–1992
 Susan Mann, historian and academic, 1993–1997
 Lorna Marsden, academic and politician 1997–2007
 Mamdouh Shoukri, academic, 2007–2017
 Rhonda Lenton, academic (sociologist), 2017–present

Labour disruptions 

York University has a history of faculty and teaching assistant strikes. In 1997, there was a faculty strike by YUFA that lasted seven weeks. At the time, this was the second longest strike in Canadian University history.

Key issues in the strike included retirement, funding, and institutional governance. In 2001, teaching assistants and contract faculty went on strike for 11 weeks, when the university broke its own record. The central issue in the 2001 disruption was the administration's proposed attempts to remove tuition indexation language.

2008 CUPE 3903 Strike

A strike beginning on November 6, 2008 concerned a variety of institutional grievances, including job security for contract professors, elimination of the Non-Academic Student Code of Conduct, creation of whistleblower protection, and fund indexation. On January 20, 2009, CUPE 3903 defeated a forced ratification vote that would have ended the strike. On January 24, Ontario premier Dalton McGuinty announced a rare Sunday recall of the provincial legislature in order to pass back-to-work legislation mandating an immediate end to the strike. On January 29, the York University Labour Disputes Resolution Act was passed in the provincial parliament on a count of 42–8 ending the long 85-day strike and setting a precedent for future university strikes in Ontario.

2015 CUPE 3903 Strike
An additional strike by teaching assistants, contract faculty, and graduate assistants took place throughout March 2015. When the strike began, on March 2, the university cancelled nearly all classes because about 2/3 of York courses were taught by the striking contract faculty at the time. On March 10, the contract faculty ratified a new agreement, but the teaching assistants and graduate assistants rejected tentative agreements the bargaining team had reached with the university. The teaching assistants and graduate assistants, continued their strike until the end of the month. Contract faculty did not go back to work in support of the union and classes remained cancelled. The union reached a tentative agreement with the university on March 29, 2015, which was ratified on March 31, 2015, thus putting an immediate end to the 29-day strike.

2018 CUPE 3903 Strike

Units 1, 2, and 3 of CUPE Local 3903, the union represented by teaching assistants, contract faculty, and graduate assistants, began striking on Monday, March 5, 2018; several months after their previous collective agreement expired on August 31, 2017. The union's aim was to, in their words, "secure a fair collective agreement that, among other things, protected quality education and creates a less precarious working environment in Ontario's university sector." The main issues of the strike revolved around job security and the path to permanent tenured employment for contract faculty. A forced ratification vote was held between April 6–9 and was rejected by an overwhelming majority by all three units. 
 On June 13, a ratification vote was held for Unit 2 members, where the union executives recommended voting against the university's offer. The results of the vote were thrown out due to the fact that there were more ballots cast than signatures of eligible voters. A re-vote was held on June 14 and 15, where Unit 2 ratified the university's offer, with 239 members voting in favour, and 122 opposed. Units 1 and 3 remained on strike until July 25, when the newly formed 42nd Parliament of Ontario led by Premier Doug Ford passed back-to-work legislation via the Urgent Priorities Act, ending the strike after 143 days, making it the longest strike in the post-secondary sector in Canadian history.

See also
 Allan I. Carswell Astronomical Observatory
 Canadian university scientific research organizations
 Education in Toronto
 Higher education in Ontario
 Las Nubes Rainforest Preserve
 List of universities in Ontario

References

Bibliography

Histories

 
 
 
 
 
 
 UPACE (1963) Master Plan for the York University Campus.
 York University (1998). York Campus Master Plan.

External links

 

 
Educational institutions established in 1959
Universities and colleges in Toronto